Halictacarus is a genus of mites in the family Acaridae.

Species
 Halictacarus halicti Mahunka, 1975

References

Acaridae